Good Clean Fun is a hardcore punk band from Washington, D.C. who took their band name from the Descendents song of the same name.

History
Formed in 1997, the band used self-irony when spreading their message of veganism, straight edge, feminism and optimism. Their main influence is New York straight edge group Gorilla Biscuits. Other influences include 7 Seconds, Minor Threat, and Youth of Today.

The band recorded three records before pretending to part ways in 2002, saying "their mission had been accomplished and they had reached their goals." At the same time, also as predicted in their song "I Can't Wait", they released a compilation album from their entire career, Positively Positive 1997-2002, on Equal Vision. The band continued the running gag, doing a 'reunion' tour in 2004.  GCF released a new record in January 2006 entitled Between Christian Rock And A Hard Place again on Equal Vision. In Europe their material is released by Reflections Records. The new album was supported by a full European and US tours. This included their third performance at Fluff Fest in the Czech Republic for which they received €300. In December 2006 the band announced they would be releasing a rarities compilation entitled Crouching Tiger, Moshing Panda and would include compilation tracks, out of print 7"'s, and some songs that are not available on any albums.

The band gained a particular internet following after they released "The MySpace Song," which is a spoof ballad about a girl who leaves her boyfriend for a person she met on MySpace, with lyrics such as "I know how emo kids feel" and "I know that I’m an adult / But Tom it’s your fault / You created a monster"

In late summer of 2009 the band completed a full-length feature film titled Good Clean Fun: The Movie, based on a script written by Diao.  Shooting began in November 2007.

Touring
In 2000, Good Clean Fun became the first underground hardcore band to go on a world tour, playing the following countries:
- Argentina
- Australia
- Austria
- Belgium
- Brazil
- Canada
- Chile
- Croatia
- Czech Republic
- Denmark
- England
- Estonia
- Finland
- France
- Germany
- Hungary
- Ireland
- Italy
- Latvia
- Lithuania
- Luxembourg
- The Netherlands
- New Zealand
- Norway
- Poland
- Portugal
- Scotland
- Slovakia
- Slovenia
- Spain
- Sweden
- Switzerland
- United States
- Wales

The band also toured in:
- Iceland (2004)
- Israel (2001)
- Mexico (2005)
- Russia (2010)

Band members
Good Clean Fun is known for its ever-changing line up. Current, past, and touring members include:

Mr. Issa
Aaron Mason
Alex Garcia-Rivera
John Robinson (of Fighting Dogs and R.A.M.B.O.)
Justin DuClos (of The Lapse and The Holy Childhood, derivations of Native Nod)
Anita Storm Van Leeuwan
Ryan Smith
Eddie Smith
Danny McClure
Mike Mowery
Justin Ingstrup
Austin Hedges
Kelly Green
Mike Phyte
John Delve
Casey Watson (of Yaphet Kotto and Look Back And Laugh)
Andrew Black  (of The Explosion and Georgie James)
John Committed
Jeff Grant (of Stop It!! and Pink Razors)
Scott Andrews (of The Scare)
Rapha (of Undressed Army)
Pete D.C.
Seth Friedlander
Thom Lambert (formerly of UnTeachers)
Javier Casas Cordero (of Nueva Ética and Sudarshana)
Sean Petteway
Jason Hamacher (formerly of Frodus)

Discography
Shopping for a Crew 7" - 1997 on Underestimated/Reflections
Who Shares Wins 7" - 1998 on Phyte
Shopping for a Crew CD - 1999 on Phyte/Dead Serious
Let's Go Crazy 7" Picture Disk - 2000 on Phyte
On the Streets Saving the Scene from the Forces of Evil - 2000 on Phyte/Reflections
Live In Springfield 12" LP - 2000 on Phyte
Shawn King can Suck It 10" LP - 2001 on Phyte
Straight Outta Hardcore - 2001 on Phyte/Reflections/Defiance
Good Clean Fun/Throwdown X-mas Split 7" -2001 on Prime Directive
Positively Positive 1997-2002 - 2002 on Equal Vision (compilation album)
Today the Scene, Tomorrow the World Live CD - 2004
Thumbs Up! 7" - 2006 on Cat 'n' Cakey Records (split with Dead After School)
Between Christian Rock and a Hard Place - 2006 on Equal Vision
Crouching Tiger, Moshing PandaCD - 2007 Self Released
Today The Scene, Tomorrow The World Live Enhanced CD - 2007 Self Released
V/A-Fight The World Not Each Other comp. - 1999 on Reflections Records
V/A-The Rebirth Of Hardcore: 1999 comp. - 1999 on SuperSoul Records
V/A-For The Kids Together comp. - 2000 on Together Records

References

External links
Equal Vision Records
Reflection Records

Hardcore punk groups from Washington, D.C.
Straight edge groups
Musical groups established in 1997
Equal Vision Records artists